The Aurora Health Care Championship was an annual United States golf tournament for professional women golfers on the Futures Tour, the LPGA Tour's developmental tour. The event was a part of the Futures Tour's schedule from 1995 to 2003, when it was played in the Milwaukee, Wisconsin area and again from 2006 to 2008, when it has been played at the Geneva National Golf Club in Lake Geneva, Wisconsin.

The title sponsor was Aurora Health Care, a Wisconsin-based health care provider.

The Tournament was a 54-hole event, as are most Futures Tour tournaments, and included pre-tournament pro-am opportunities, in which local amateur golfers can play with the professional golfers from the Tour as a benefit for local charities. Benefiting charities from the Aurora Health Care Championship were The Geneva National Foundation and Aurora Health Care.

Tournament names through the years: 
1995–1999: Aurora Health Care Futures Classic
2000: Aurora Health Care Futures Charity Golf Classic
2001: Aurora Health Care SBC Futures Charity Golf Classic
2002–2003: Aurora Health Care Futures Charity Golf Classic
2006–2008: Aurora Health Care Championship

Winners

*Championship won in sudden-death playoff.
**Tournament shortened to 36 holes because of rain.

External links
Futures Tour official website
Geneva National Golf Club official website
Ironwood Golf Course official website
Naga-Waukee Golf Course official website

Former Symetra Tour events
Golf in Wisconsin
Sports in Milwaukee